Romeo Kapudija (born 20 May 1970) is an American-Croatian professional race car driver from Chicago, Illinois.

After competing in karting and amateur Formula Atlantic and Skip Barber Formula Dodge competition, he made his 1st professional Toyota Atlantic start  in 1999 at Long Beach finishing 11th overall in 1st in C2. He continued to race in the professional ranks in 2002 driving part-time in the American Le Mans Series in the GT class. He competed in the 12 Hours of Sebring in 2004 and competed in Grand-Am Cup  from 2005 to 2007 as co-driver to Patrick Dempsey. He moved up to Grand-Am's Rolex Sports Car Series GT class in 2008 driving for Matt Connelly Motorsports. In 2010 he made his Daytona Prototype debut at the 2010 24 Hours of Daytona co-driving Beyer Racing's Chevy-Crawford. In 2010 he competed full-time in the American Le Mans Series' new GTC class driving for Alex Job Racing.

Complete motorsports results

American Open-Wheel racing results
(key) (Races in bold indicate pole position, races in italics indicate fastest race lap)

Atlantic Championship

Complete USF2000 National Championship results

References

External links 
 
Romeo Kapudija at Driver Database

1970 births
Living people
Atlantic Championship drivers
Rolex Sports Car Series drivers
American Le Mans Series drivers
Racing drivers from Chicago
American people of Croatian descent
U.S. F2000 National Championship drivers